Effigy Mounds National Monument preserves more than 200 prehistoric mounds built by pre-Columbian
Mound Builder cultures, mostly in the first millennium CE, during the later part of the  Woodland period of pre-Columbian North America.
Numerous effigy mounds are shaped like animals, including bears and birds. 

The monument is located primarily in Allamakee County, Iowa, with a small part in Clayton County, Iowa, in the midwestern United States. The park's visitor center is located in Harpers Ferry, Iowa, just north of Marquette.
In 2017, the Effigy Mounds were featured in the America the Beautiful Quarters Program.

Mounds
 

Prehistoric earthworks by mound builder cultures are common in the Midwest.  However, mounds in the shape of mammals, birds, or reptiles, known as effigies, apparently were constructed primarily by peoples in what is now known as southern Wisconsin, northeast Iowa, and small parts of Minnesota and Illinois. An exception is the Great Serpent Mound in south-eastern Ohio.

Effigy Mounds National Monument takes in the western edge of the effigy region. The North Unit (67 mounds) and South Unit (29 mounds) are located where the counties meet along the Mississippi River. They are contiguous and easily accessible. Other mounds are located on remote parts of the Monument property. The monument contains  with 206 mounds, of which 31 are effigies. The largest, Great Bear Mound, measures 42 meters from head to tail and rises over a meter above the original ground level.

In northeastern Iowa the Effigy Mounds area was a point of transition between the eastern hardwood forests and the central prairies. Native American and early settlers would have been able to draw on natural resources available in forests, wetlands, and prairies. These areas were occupied by humans for many centuries.

Effigy Mounds is adjacent to the Upper Mississippi River National Wildlife and Fish Refuge, the Driftless Area National Wildlife Refuge, the Yellow River State Forest, and a short distance to the south, Pikes Peak State Park. There are also a number of state-owned wildlife management areas, such as the one at Sny Magill Creek, where Clayton County also maintains a county park.

Tribes associated with the monument 
Numerous federally recognized tribes have linguistic and cultural ties to the ancestral peoples who built the effigy and other earthwork mounds at the monument site. The National Park Service recognizes a cultural association between the monument and the following present nations:

 Iowa Tribe of Kansas and Nebraska
 Iowa Tribe of Oklahoma
 Otoe–Missouria Tribe of Indians
 Ho-Chunk Nation of Wisconsin
 Winnebago Tribe of Nebraska
 Upper Sioux Community of Minnesota
 Shakopee Mdewakanton Sioux Community In the State of Minnesota
 Lower Sioux Indian Community of Mdewakanton Sioux Indians of Minnesota
 Prairie Island Indian Community In the State of Minnesota
 Sac and Fox Tribe of the Mississippi in Iowa
 Sac and Fox Nation of Missouri in Kansas and Nebraska
 Sac and Fox Nation of Oklahoma
 Crow Creek Sioux of South Dakota
 Omaha Tribe of Nebraska
 Santee Sioux Nation of Nebraska
 Standing Rock Sioux Tribe of North Dakota
 Yankton Sioux Tribe of South Dakota
 Sisseton Wahpeton Oyate
 Flandreau Santee Sioux Tribe
 Ponca Tribe of Nebraska

Public access

The visitor center, located at the park entrance, contains museum exhibits highlighting archaeological and natural specimens, an auditorium, and book sales outlet. The park has 14 miles of hiking trails. No paved public automobile access roads exist in the park. Rangers give guided hikes and prehistoric tool demonstrations that are scheduled and advertised, mid-June through Labor Day weekend. Educational programs are presented on- and off-site by appointment.

Natural features in the monument include forests, tallgrass prairies, wetlands and rivers. There are no lodging or camping facilities in the park. Excellent camping is available at nearby Pikes Peak State Park and Yellow River State Forest in Iowa; there is also Wyalusing State Park in Wisconsin. Various primitive campgrounds exist in the area as well. The national monument is quite close to the town of Marquette, Iowa, and is just across the Mississippi River from the city of Prairie du Chien, Wisconsin, where ample motel and gambling-boat facilities exist.

Effigy Mounds was proclaimed a National Monument on October 25, 1949. Charles R. Keyes, head of the Iowa Archaeological Survey, and Ellison Orr, chief field supervisor for the Iowa Archaeological Survey, worked to survey and map the area, and to establish its significance for preservation.

Driftless Area
The Effigy Mounds National Monument is noted for being in the Driftless Area, an area of North America which escaped glaciation during the last ice age.  The adjacent Driftless Area National Wildlife Refuge takes its name from this region.

The Park Service writes:

Patchy remnants of Pre-Illinoian glacial drift more than 500,000 years old recently have been discovered in the area. Unlike the rest of Iowa, the Paleozoic Plateau was bypassed by the last of the Pleistocene glaciers (the Wisconsin), allowing the region's fast cutting streams to expose and carve out deep channels in the bedrock-dominated terrain. The area is characterized by thin loess soil cover, isolated patches of glacial drift, deeply entrenched river valleys, and karst (sinkholes, caves, and springs) topography.

Conservation issues

From 1999 to 2009, Superintendent Phyllis Ewing "oversaw more than $3 million in illegal construction of boardwalks, trails and other structures that damaged irreplaceable archaeological artifacts."  She failed to conduct consultation with affiliated American Indian tribes and follow procedures of the National Historic Preservation Act and other statutes. The Park Service conducted an internal investigation, finding numerous violations but no intent to damage the park.

In July 2016, Thomas Munson, Superintendent for 20 years of the Effigy Mounds National Monument, was sentenced to several days in prison after pleading guilty to stealing bones in 1990 of 40 ancient Native Americans, who lived between 700 and 2,500 years ago, from the holdings of the museum at the site. The remains had been excavated along with artifacts from burial mounds at the park. Munson was apparently trying to evade the proposed provisions of the Native American Graves Protection and Repatriation Act (NAGPRA), which was passed by Congress that year. The act provides for artifacts and bones to be returned or repatriated by governmental agencies and other institutions to tribes who are affiliated with the peoples who buried the items.

Tracing the bones could have demonstrated a link to the affiliated tribes and required return of both the remains and related artifacts from grave goods. Without that evidence, most of the artifacts have been retained by the park museum. The government conducted a five-year investigation through the US Attorney's Office, following questions raised in 2011 by Iowa Tribe of Kansas and Nebraska member Patt Murphy. As tribal representative under NAGPRA to receive "remains and funerary objects for repatriation and reburial," he had requested an inventory from the national monument of all remains and goods, which they could not provide. This began the inquiry. Murphy has praised the work of the US Attorney's Office and others in this case.

Munson was sentenced to a year of home detention, 10 weekends in jail, and paying "$108,905 in restitution for the damage he caused to the bones and a $3,000 fine." Munson had retired from the National Park Service in 1994.

Jim Nepstad, who was appointed superintendent at the monument in 2011, is working to restore those disturbed areas of the park. He is also working to rebuild the Park Service's standing with area residents and members of the site's affiliated American Indian tribes.

See also
 Effigy Mounds National Monument Review Team Report
 Iowa archaeology
 Indians of Iowa
 Indian Mounds Park (disambiguation)
 List of burial mounds in the United States
 List of national monuments of the United States

References
 The National Parks: Index 2001–2003. Washington: U.S. Department of the Interior.

External links

 Official NPS website: Effigy Mounds National Monument
 Sny Magill Creek Unit coordinates: 

Mounds in Iowa
Native American history of Iowa
Native American museums in Iowa
Archaeological museums in Iowa
Museums in Allamakee County, Iowa
National Register of Historic Places in Allamakee County, Iowa
Protected areas on the Mississippi River
National Park Service National Monuments in Iowa
Protected areas established in 1949
Archaeological sites on the National Register of Historic Places in Iowa
Historic districts on the National Register of Historic Places in Iowa
Historic districts in Allamakee County, Iowa
Historic districts in Clayton County, Iowa
Driftless Area
Protected areas of Allamakee County, Iowa
Protected areas of Clayton County, Iowa
Hill figures
Geoglyphs
1949 establishments in Iowa